Ben Chapman (born 3 May 1991) is a British Virgin Islands' international football goalkeeper, who currently plays for English non-league side Leek Town.

Club career
His club career has seen him play for Nantwich Town, Market Drayton Town, Kidsgrove Athletic, Glossop North End, Eccleshall and Airbus UK Broughton in Wales. He has had three spells playing for Leek Town. During his last spell with the club he had three loan periods at other clubs. In 2018 he joined Winsford United. In January 2019, Hanley Town took him on a short-term loan. In September 2019 he joined Congleton Town on loan.

In July 2020 he signed on a permanent deal with former loan club, Hanley Town.  In March 2022 he rejoined Leek Town.

International career
Born in Stoke-on-Trent, Chapman qualified to play for the British Virgin Islands due to him holding a British passportand he made his debut for them in the Caribbean Cup on 22 March 2016, against Martinique. He then played for the islands in the CONCACAF Nations League.

Career statistics

International

References

External links

1991 births
Living people
Footballers from Stoke-on-Trent
Association football goalkeepers
British Virgin Islands footballers
British Virgin Islands international footballers
Nantwich Town F.C. players
Newcastle Town F.C. players
Leek Town F.C. players
Airbus UK Broughton F.C. players
Market Drayton Town F.C. players
Kidsgrove Athletic F.C. players
Glossop North End A.F.C. players
Winsford United F.C. players
Hanley Town F.C. players
English footballers
Congleton Town F.C. players